Boana exastis is a species of frog in the family Hylidae. It is endemic to the Northeast Region of Brazil and has been recorded from Bahia, Alagoas, and Pernambuco.

Records have been made in primary forest with large trees and an abundance of epiphytes, adjacent to and in a forest edge, and cocoa plantations adjacent to the forest. Breeding presumably takes place in temporary pools or permanent streams. Threats to this species are unknown; its ability to persist in modified habitats such cocoa plantations remains to be seen.

References

Boana
Frogs of South America
Amphibians of Brazil
Endemic fauna of Brazil
Amphibians described in 2003
Taxa named by Ulisses Caramaschi
Taxa named by Miguel Trefaut Rodrigues
Taxonomy articles created by Polbot